Hedya salicella  is a moth of the family Tortricidae. It is found in Europe.

The wingspan is 19–24 mm. The moth flies from June to October. .

The larvae feed on large holes and  willow and poplar.

Notes
The flight season refers to Belgium and The Netherlands. This may vary in other parts of the range.

External links
 waarneming.nl 
 Lepidoptera of Belgium
 Hedya salicella at UKmoths

Olethreutinae
Moths described in 1758
Taxa named by Carl Linnaeus
Moths of Japan
Tortricidae of Europe
Insects of Turkey